Barningham is a village in County Durham, in the Pennines of England.

History
Barningham is listed in Domesday Book as a property owned in 1066 by a Saxon lord, Thor, prior to the Norman conquest; by 1086, the ownership had transferred to Enisant Musard, with Count Alan of Brittany as a tenant.

Barningham is historically located in the North Riding of Yorkshire but along with the rest of the former Startforth Rural District it was transferred to County Durham for administrative and ceremonial purposes on 1 April 1974, under the provisions of the Local Government Act 1972.

Amenities
Barningham is a tranquil conservation village of around 60 houses. It has a large village green, a church, a stately hall occupied by a local landowning baronet, a village hall used by local interest groups and a recently restored pub. It is on the edge of moors stretching westwards to Cumbria and is a good base for walking the local dales and hills. The village has an enthusiastic local history society which runs a website and offers assistance to anyone trying to trace ancestors from the area.

Notable buildings
Barningham Park has been the home of the Milbank family since 1690. It is a Grade II* listed country house dating from the 15th century set in a 7000-acre estate.

The Milbank Arms is a Grade II listed public house built in the early 19th century and extensively rebuilt in 2019.  It was formerly on the Campaign for Real Ale's National Inventory of Historic Pub Interiors.

References

External links
 

Villages in County Durham